Bruce Edward Watson (born August 17, 1953) is an American writer who specializes in American culture and history. He has written six books as well as feature articles, humorous essays, and book reviews for Smithsonian Magazine, American Heritage, and other publications. Watson publishes a blog called The Attic that highlights true stories ‘’for a kinder, cooler America.’’

Biography
Watson was born on August 17, 1953 in Peoria, IL and grew up in Orange County, California. He studied creative writing at Pomona College from 1971 to 1973. He received a B.A. in journalism in 1976 from the University of California, Berkeley, an Elementary Education credential from California State University San Francisco in 1981, a M.Ed. in Elementary Education, specializing in Math, Science, and Instructional Technology from the University of Massachusetts Amherst in 1990, and a M.A. in American History from the University of Massachusetts Amherst in 1995. He has taught at Deerfield Academy, the University of Massachusetts Amherst, Bard College, and Hampshire College.

Since January 20, 2017, Watson has published a blog, The Attic. Watson conceived the site as a non-political response to the intensely partisan politics.  “I was tired of all the anger,” he said. “It seemed like it was driving so much of the coverage and content in magazines and newspapers. At the same time, it felt like something was really being lost with our history. You have to know your country, know the past to move past all the anger.”

Watson received The Bread and Roses Hall of Fame award in 2017.

Works

References

External links
Interview with Watson

1953 births
Living people
American non-fiction writers
Pomona College alumni